The 2011 Guzzini Challenger was a professional tennis tournament played on hard courts. It was the ninth edition of the tournament which was part of the 2011 ATP Challenger Tour. It took place in Recanati, Italy between 25 and 31 July 2011.

ATP entrants

Seeds

 1 Rankings are as of July 18, 2011.

Other entrants
The following players received wildcards into the singles main draw:
  Federico Gaio
  Paolo Lorenzi
  Giacomo Miccini
  Federico Torresi

The following players received entry from the qualifying draw:
  Andrea Agazzi
  Flavio Cipolla
  Fabrice Martin
  Matwé Middelkoop

Champions

Singles

 Fabrice Martin def.  Kenny de Schepper, 6–1, 6–7(6–8), 7–6(7–3)

Doubles

 Frederik Nielsen /  Ken Skupski def.  Federico Gaio /  Purav Raja, 6–4, 7–5

External links
Official Website
ITF Search 
ATP official site

Guzzini Challenger
Guzzini Challenger
2011 in Italian tennis